Light & Magic is the second studio album by English electronic music band Ladytron. It was released in the United States on 17 September 2002 by Emperor Norton and in the United Kingdom on 2 December 2002 by Telstar Records. The album has been reissued multiple times, most recently by Nettwerk in January 2011.

An earlier version of the song "NuHorizons" appeared as a B-side to the band's 2001 single "The Way That I Found You", under the title "Holiday 601". "Seventeen" is part of the soundtrack to the 2003 film Party Monster, while its instrumental was used in television advertisements for Christina Aguilera's 2008 fragrance Inspire.

Drowned in Sound ranked Light & Magic at number 14 on its Top 41 Albums of the Year list. Rolling Stone included the album on its 50 Best Albums of 2002 list. British dance music magazine Muzik named it the best electropop album of 2002. NME included it at number 41 on their Albums and Tracks of the Year for 2002 list.

Track listing

Light & Magic (Remixed & Rare)
On 1 September 2009, Redbird Records and Cobraside Distribution released a compilation of remixes, B-sides and rarities titled Light & Magic (Remixed & Rare). The cover is the negative of the US cover for Light & Magic. Nettwerk reissued Light & Magic (Remixed & Rare) on 20 December 2011 with a slightly altered track listing, removing "Cease2xist" (Instrumental 2002) and adding "Flicking Your Switch" (Erol Alkan Remix).

Personnel
Credits adapted from the liner notes of Light & Magic.

Ladytron
 Daniel Hunt
 Reuben Wu
 Helen Marnie
 Mira Aroyo

Additional musicians
 Michael Fitzpatrick – additional programming
 Roger Joseph Manning Jr. – additional keyboards
 Shari – backing vocals on "Seventeen"
 Justin Meldal-Johnsen – electric bass

Technical
 Daniel Hunt – production
 Mickey Petralia – additional production, mixing
 Michael Fitzpatrick – engineering
 Matt Fausak – engineering assistance
 Aleks Tamulis – engineering assistance

Artwork
 Big Active – art direction, design
 Ladytron – art direction
 Donald Milne – photography
 Tom Dolan – art direction, design (US edition)
 William Howard – photography (US edition)

Charts

Release history

References

2002 albums
Albums produced by Mickey Petralia
Emperor Norton Records albums
Ladytron albums
Telstar Records albums